McKinstry is a surname. Notable people with the surname include:

Alexander McKinstry (1822–1879), American politician
Arthur R. McKinstry (1894–1991), American Episcopal bishop
Chris McKinstry (1967–2006), Canadian artificial intelligence researcher
Elisha W. McKinstry (1824–1901), American jurist
Henry McKinstry, Canadian mayor
James A. McKinstry (born 1942), American football player
James McKinstry (born 1979), Scottish footballer
Johnny McKinstry (born 1985), Northern Irish football manager
Leo McKinstry (born 1962), Northern Irish writer and journalist
Nancy McKinstry (born 1959), American businesswoman
Zach McKinstry (born 1995) American professional baseball infielder for the Los Angeles Dodgers

See also
McKinstry's Mills Historic District, a historic district in Maryland, United States
William McKinstry Farmhouse, a historic house in Massachusetts, United States
William McKinstry, Jr. House, a historic house in Massachusetts, United States

Surnames of British Isles origin